Kolbasov is a village and municipality in Snina District in the Prešov Region of north-eastern Slovakia.

Etymology
Klobásov—"a place where sausages (klobása, in dialects also kolbása, klbása) are made". The village was famous for its slaughterhouse. Alternativelly, something curved (a street, a creek or a village, the village was founded by the bend of the creek).   Kolbasa, Kolbazo 1548 (the first written mention), Kolbaso 1773, Kolbásow 1808; in Hungarian also Kolbaszó until 1899, after renamed to Végaszó.

History

Several Jews were murdered here by Ukrainian Insurgent Army (UPA) on 8 December 1945, the last night of Chanuka.

Geography
The municipality lies at an altitude of 312 metres and covers an area of 15.965 km2. It has a population of about 110 people.

References

External links
 
 
https://web.archive.org/web/20071006173841/http://www.statistics.sk/mosmis/eng/run.html

Villages and municipalities in Snina District